Festas Juninas (June Festivals, "festivities that occur in the month of June"), also known as festas de São João for their part in celebrating the nativity of St. John the Baptist (June 24), are the annual Brazilian celebrations adapted from European Midsummer that take place in the southern midwinter. These festivities, which were introduced by the Portuguese during the colonial period (1500–1822), are celebrated during the month of June nationwide. The festival is mainly celebrated on the eves of the Catholic solemnities of Saint Anthony, Saint John the Baptist, and Saint Peter.

Since Northeastern Brazil is largely arid or semi-arid, these festivals not only coincide with the end of the rainy seasons of most states in the northeast, but they also provide people with an opportunity to give thanks to Saint John for the rain. They also celebrate rural life and feature typical clothing, food, and dance (particularly quadrilha, which is similar to square dance).

Origins and history 
Various aspects of the festival originate from the European Midsummer celebrations, such as the creation of a large bonfire. Many of these celebrations now occur with influence from Brazilian rural society. The festivities usually take place in an arraial, a huge tent made of raw material (with a thatched roof) that was reserved for important parties in older Brazilian rural areas. As the Brazilian climate differs greatly from Europe, Brazilian participants would often use the festival as a way to show gratitude for rain. The creation of a large fire, known as a fogueira, is lit during the festival. This originates from a Catholic story of a fire being lit to warn Mary about the birth of St. John the Baptist, and thus to have her assistance after childbirth, Elizabeth would have to light a fire on a hill. 

Most festivals occurred away from the coast line, closer to the interior where many larger plantations were. While still ruled by Portugal, coastline cities, in Pernambuco especially, became industrialized and saw much greater economic prosperity. Hoping to further this growth, King Dom João modified his economic policy to favor cities such as Recife rather than rural interests. Though the Festa Junina continued, its practice in modern cities became much larger. Today, the sizes of the celebrations have surpassed that of Europe. Although they are primarily practiced and hosted by schools, many cities host their own major celebration. In Caruaru, Pernambuco, a celebration of the festival in 2011 saw approximately 1.5 million attendees, earning a Guinness Book World Record for having the largest celebration of the festival in the world.

Traditions 
In Brazil, the festival is primarily practiced by rural farmers, known as caipiras or matutos.  Men dress up as farm boys with large straw hats and women wear pigtails, freckles, painted gap teeth and red-checkered dresses.

Dances throughout the festival surround "quadrilha". Most of these dances emerge from 19th-century Europe, which were brought by the Portuguese. The "quadrilha" features couple formations around a mock wedding whose bride and groom are the central focus of the dance. This reflects the fertility of the land. There are various types of dance within the category of quadrilha. Cana-Verde, a subcategory of fandango dance styles, are more popular in the south and are primarily improvised. Dances involving Bumba Meu Boi are also present during this festival. Here, the dance revolves around a woman desiring to eat the tongue of an ox. Her husband kills the ox, to the dismay of the ox's owner. A healer enters and resuscitates the ox, and all participants celebrate.

Accompanying these dances is a genre of music known as Forró. This traditional genre primarily uses accordions and triangles, and focuses on the life and struggle of caipiras. The music greatly focuses on saudade, a feeling of nostalgia or forlorn, for rural farm life. More modern versions of the music can include guitars, fiddles, and drums.

Many games targeted at children are present at Festa Juninas, especially at festivals hosted in schools serving as a fundraiser.

 Pescaria: Children use a fishing rod to pick up cans or paper designed to look like fish from a box. 
 Corrida do saci: Children hop on one leg to the end of a line in a race, mimicking the movement of the saci perere. 
 Corrida de três pés: A three-legged race, where two participants tie one of their legs to their partner's leg, and race others. 
 Jogo de argolas: Ring Toss. Rings are thrown onto bottles in an attempt to land around the neck. 
 Tiro ao Alvo: Dart toss. Darts are thrown in an attempt to gain the most points.

Winners of these games are often given miscellaneous prizes, usually toys or food.

Modern criticisms 
Today, São João festivities are extremely popular in Brazil's largest cities. The presence of a festival celebrating rural life in an urban setting has revealed modern stereotypes of caipiras. Those residing in larger cities believe rural farmers to be less educated and unable to properly socialize. This is often reflected in caricatures of caipiras taught to children in Brazilian schools, who are told to use incorrect grammar and act foolish during the festival. Anxieties over the changing meaning of the festival also reflect a growing "carnavalization" of the tradition. Rather than an emphasis on religion, the festival is presented as a massive gathering for both Brazilians and tourists with large concerts in major cities.

See also
 Festa de São João do Porto

References

External links

Patronal festivals in Brazil
Saint John's Day